The Cocoa Expos were a short-lived professional minor league baseball team based Cocoa, Florida in . The club, which featured future hall of famer and 1986 World Series champion, Gary Carter,  was a member of the rookie-level Florida East Coast League. During their only season in existence, the team posted a 9–47 record, which gave them fourth place in the league.

Notable alumni
Dennis Blair
Gary Carter
Ellis Valentine
Michel Dion - pro hockey

References
BR 1972 Cocoa Expos

Defunct minor league baseball teams
Defunct baseball teams in Florida
Baseball teams established in 1972
1972 establishments in Florida
1972 disestablishments in Florida
Cocoa, Florida
Baseball teams disestablished in 1972